Gallet may refer to:

People with the surname
 Anne Gallet, a Swiss harpsichordist and musicologist
 Charles Gallet (1875-1951), French politician
 Léon Gallet (1832–1899), watchmaker and philanthropist, patriarch of the Gallet Watch Company
 Louis Gallet (1835–1898), a French writer of operatic libretti, plays, romances, memoirs, pamphlets
 Luciano Gallet (1893–1931), a Brazilian composer, conductor and pianist
 Mathieu Gallet (born 1977), French high-ranking civil servant

Other
 Gallet & Co., a historic Swiss watch and clock manufacturer
 Air Gallet, a vertically scrolling shoot 'em up arcade game developed by Gazelle
 Gallet Clamshell, the world's first water resistant chronograph wristwatch
 Gallet Flight Officer, the world's first time zone calculating wristwatch
 CGF Gallet, a French company producer of the SPECTRA combat helmet and the F1 helmet for firemen
 Le Gallet, a commune in the Oise department in northern France
 small splinters of stone inserted in the joints of coarse masonry to protect the mortar joints : see Glossary of architecture